The 2015 season is Home United's 20th consecutive season in the top flight of Singapore football and in the S.League. Along with the S.League, the club will also compete in the Prime League, the Singapore Cup and the Singapore League Cup.

Squad

S.League squad

Prime League squad

Club

Coaching staff

{|class="wikitable"
|-
!Position
!Staff
|-
|S.League Head Coach|| Philippe Aw
|-
|S.League Assistant CoachPrime League Head Coach|| Robin Chitrakar
|-
|S.League Assistant Coach|| Steve Vilmiaire
|-
|Team Manager|| Badri Ghent
|-
|Technical Director|| Steve Vilmiaire
|-
|Technical Director|| Adlane Messelem
|-
|Goalkeeper Coach|| Adi Saleh
|-
|Head of Sports Performance|| Dirk Schauenberg
|-
|Sports Trainer|| Daisyree Anarna
|-
|Logistics Officer|| Mohd Zahir
|-
|Prime League Team Manager|| Bernard Lan
|-
|rowspan="2"|Under-17 Head Coach|| Fadzuhasny Juraimi
|-
| Syed Azmir
|-
|rowspan="2"|Under-15 Head Coach|| Syed Karim
|-
| Yahya Madon
|-

Transfers

Pre-season transfers

In

Out

Promoted

Team statistics

Appearances and goals

Numbers in parentheses denote appearances as substitute.

Competitions

S.League

Singapore Cup

Home United won 4-1 on aggregate.

Home United won 4-3 on aggregate.

Singapore League Cup

References 

Home United FC seasons
Home United